Parazacco is a genus of small freshwater fish in the family Cyprinidae, native to China and Vietnam.

Species
According to FishBase, there are currently two recognized species in this genus, but the Catalog of Fishes considers the first as a synonym of the second.

 Parazacco fasciatus (Koller, 1927)
 Parazacco spilurus (Günther, 1868) (Predaceous chub)

References 

Cyprinidae genera
Xenocyprinae